Mario Alberto Rozas Córdova (born 2 February 1967) is a Chilean Carabineros officer, who was general director of that institution from December 22, 2018 to November 19, 2020.

Biography 
He was born in the city of Linares, capital of the homonymous province in Chile. He is the son of the Major Warrant Officer of the Carabineros de Chile, Mario Rozas Ortiz. Two of his brothers also belong to the Carabineros, and he is married to Carola Valeska Ahengo Triviño, also a member of the uniformed police, who holds the rank of colonel.

He graduated from the School of Carabineros in 1987 and, according to the Government of Chile in 2018, "has operational and territorial experience in different destinations in Chile. He also has experience in specialized areas such as traffic, highways and road safety, as well as communications". He has also served in Spain and was an aide to President Sebastián Piñera during his first government. He studied journalism at the University of Development and has a master's degree in communications.

He was promoted to the rank of general of Carabineros in 2017, appointed by President Michelle Bachelet.

Chief of Carabineros 
After the departure of General Director Hermes Soto, as a result of questioning the institution after the murder by the police of Mapuche farmer Camilo Catrillanca, Rozas was appointed by President Sebastián Piñera as the new head of the uniformed police. At the time of his appointment, he was serving as director of Welfare at the institution.

During Rozas' term as chief, the 2019–20 Chilean protests took place, where various episodes of repression and police brutality were committed by the Carabineros, which have been accused to be human rights violations by different organizations. Rozas was the subject of a complaint for crimes against humanity that also included President Piñera and other officials of his government during this time period.

On November 19th of 2020, President Sebastián Piñera removed his charge as head of the police, after incidents during protests in which two minors were shot. He was replaced by Ricardo Yáñez.

References 

Living people
1967 births
Carabineros de Chile
General Directors of Carabineros de Chile
People from Linares
Chilean police officers